Rupbas is a town and a municipality in Rupbas Tehsil in Bharatpur district in the state of Rajasthan, India.

References

Cities and towns in Bharatpur district